The State Register of Heritage Places is maintained by the Heritage Council of Western Australia. , 53 places are heritage-listed in the Shire of Shark Bay, of which three are on the State Register of Heritage Places, all on Dirk Hartog Island.

List

State Register of Heritage Places
The Western Australian State Register of Heritage Places, lists the following state registered places within the Shire of Shark Bay:

Shire of Shark Bay heritage-listed places
The following places are heritage listed in the Shire of Shark Bay but are not State registered:

References

Shark
Shire of Shark Bay